A Dark and Hungry God Arises (or officially The Gap into Power: A Dark and Hungry God Arises) is a science fiction novel by American  writer Stephen R. Donaldson, the third book of The Gap Cycle   series.

Plot summary
As the newly 'welded' cyborg Angus Thermopyle and his distrusted companion Milos Taverner arrive in their Gap Scout, Trumpet, at the illegal outpost in Amnion space known as Billingate, The Bill, the ruler of Billingate, intercepts the escape pod containing Morn Hyland's recently forcegrown child, Davies Hyland. Despite being only a few days old, the forcegrowing technique the Amnion used on him have made him physically resemble a sixteen-year-old boy.

Morn suffers from an insanity-causing ailment known as Gap Sickness for which she uses a device called a zone implant in the event of gap travel. When Morn's mind was copied onto Davies' during the force growing process to make up for his lack of a developmental/formative childhood, Morn somehow survived the copying which, it was explained, should have killed her. The Amnion, a misanthropic alien race bent on the eventual domination of the human race, and the ones who conceded to perform the force growing of Davies, suspect that it is the presence of Morn's zone implant that saved her; these circumstances make the mother and son uniquely valuable to the Amnion. The Amnion have followed Morn and her son to Billingate in the hopes of getting them back for further study.

Captain Nick Succorso, aboard his ship the Captain's Fancy, is furious at Morn for not only making him think that she loved him, but, more recently, for diverting the escape pod containing her son away from an Amnion warship. Nick had promised Davies to the Amnion as a show of good faith. In his fury he gives them Morn, but not before she has broken into his quarters to steal an immunization drug designed to counteract Amnion mutagens that would turn her into one of them.

Nick is left in a precarious position. The Amnion continue to demand Davies Hyland, but Davies is in the custody of The Bill, who shrewdly asks for compensation for the child. Because of their convoluted dealings, the Amnion have revoked a credit voucher they gave Nick, so he has no credit to give The Bill for Davies. Because of this, Nick is stuck on Billingate and simply wanders the 'cruise'.

After Milos finishes abusing Angus by using the priority codes for Angus' computer, which were given to him by UMCPHQ, Angus and Milos disembark at Billingate and eventually meet up with Angus' nemesis, Nick. They form an uneasy truce.

Nick explains that he needs Davies and will give Morn to them in exchange for Morn's son, should Nick be able to recover him. Nick of course does not mention he's already handed Morn over to the Amnion and, as far as he knows, has already been turned into one of them. Angus and Milos are surprised to learn that Angus' programming includes rescuing Morn, something they were told was not the case. Milos becomes furious and begins to distrust his orders, the UMCP and Angus.

While waiting for Nick to find out where Davies is being held, Milos asserts his previously unperceived control over Angus, making him eat his live nic butts, in front of Billingate's bug eyes - a mistake that will cost him later.

After finding out where the detention centre is, Angus' computer reveals to him that he is capable of emitting a type of jamming field that can bend light rendering him invisible to electronic surveillance, thus protecting his identity. His programming makes him take Milos with him, because he cannot really be trusted on his own. They descend into the depths of Billingate, where they find Davies locked away in a cell.

When Nick handed Morn over to the Amnion, some of his crew, Mikka Vasaczk, Nick's second in command, Vector Shaheed, his engineer, Sib Mackern, his data first, and Ciro "Pup" Vasaczk, Vector's assistant, all begin to turn against him. Sensing a mutiny, Nick sends them to do specific tasks on Billingate to 'get them out of the way'. Against orders, they all meet up and decide to abandon Captain's Fancy as they've clearly outlived their usefulness to Nick.

When Angus and Milos return to Trumpet with Davies, they confront Nick when he arrives and decide to keep Davies rather than hand him over to Nick, who intends to turn him over to the Amnion. Nick also reveals that Morn is in Amnion custody. Angus begins to form a plan to rescue her when Milos, and then Nick, leave the ship.

Milos immediately heads to the Amnion sector of Billingate and there it becomes apparent that he's been working for them as a double agent for some time. The Amnion emissary, Marc Vestabule, an abortive Amnion attempt at turning a human into an Amnion while maintaining a human-like appearance, informs Milos that both they and The Bill are aware that he has some kind of control over Angus. Vestabule then, to Milos' extreme horror, subdues Milos and injects him with Amnion mutagens.

In the meantime Nick is confronted by his former crew: Mikka, Vector, Sib and Pup. While arguing, they are all approached by Billingate security and Nick, being barred from Captain's Fancy, flees for Trumpet while being pursued by Mikka and company, followed closely by security.

Angus reluctantly lets them in. While The Bill rages over the comm, they begin to formulate and act out a plan to rescue Morn.

Nick contacts Captain's Fancy and instructs Liete Corregio, his third in command, to attack the ship called Soar, as Nick has discovered that it is captained by Sorus Chatelaine, a woman who seduced, betrayed and abandoned Nick as a young man, but not before leaving the streaked scars underneath his eyes that act as his emotional barometer.

Angus instructs Davies, Vector and Pup to sabotage Billingate's communications systems while Nick, Mikka, Sib and Angus himself go EVA to the Amnion sector to rescue Morn.

After breaking inside, Angus is confronted by Milos, who has now been turned into an Amnion while still retaining his human memories, mannerisms and form - the Amnion apparently having perfected their mutagens. Milos attempts to use Angus' priority codes against him and his newfound allies, but new programming takes over that overrides those codes with new ones, allowing Angus both to ignore Milos' orders and attempt to kill him. Milos escapes, but they soon find Morn in her cell, still human thanks to the immunity drug she stole from Nick.

Angus puts Mikka in charge and gets Sib to help Morn into the spare EVA suit they brought when he suddenly leaves to sabotage Billingate's reactor.

On their way back to Trumpet, the rescue party witnesses an Amnion shuttle containing The Bill leave the station, as well as the destruction of an Amnion warship that had been rammed by Captain's Fancy, which Leite did to prevent the ship from firing on Mikka, Morn, Sib and Nick while they were walking across the face of Billingate.

When back on Trumpet, Nick attempts to take over the ship by holding Pup hostage, demanding that they leave without Angus. Pup manages to subdue Nick with a stun prod he landed on when forced into Milos' old command station. Then Angus appears back on board and begins to get Trumpet ready to leave.

While Nick and Angus finish the preparations, everyone else leaves for quarters to secure for heavy g.

An Amnion warship and a few other human pirate ships converge on Trumpet as it disengages from Billingate just as Billingate's reactor explodes. Trumpet escapes into the gap, presumably leaving all the other ships left behind to be destroyed.

Meanwhile, back on Earth, Warden Dios, the director of the UMCP, gathers together his directors, Min Donner, director of the UMCP's Enforcement Division (ED), Hashi Lebwohl, director of Data Acquisition (DA), and Godsen Frik, director of Protocol (PR), for a video conference with the Governing Council of Earth and Space (GCES), brought about by the apparent escape of the known pirate Angus Thermopyle and suspected traitor Milos Taverner, as such was their cover story when they left UMCPHQ.

The GCES demands disclosure and uses the opportunity to ask about Morn Hyland, a UMCP ensign they apparently abandoned to pirates and the Amnion. Warden and Hashi offer half-truths to the Council, telling them that they failed to recapture Angus and Milos, and that they arranged for Morn to be given to Nick as 'payment' for a job they had him do so that she could be used as a bargaining chip should Nick's mission at Billingate fail. The mission was to give a non-working anti-mutagen drug in hopes that it would disrupt Billingate's usefulness to the Amnion, not letting on that they gave him a working anti-mutagen drug that the UMCP suppressed years previous.

Later Dios admits to Min in confidence that he did this purposely in hopes to get the UMCP severed from the UMC so that it would be reformed under the GCES.  Dios hopes to disrupt the power that Holt Fasner, the CEO of the UMC, has over human controlled space. He then instructs Min to leave UMCPHQ, which is orbiting Earth, for Suka Bator. There Min meets with Captain Sixten Vertigus, the man who made first contact with the Amnion, and is now a member of the GCES. She convinces him to propose a bill of severance that would put the UMCP under the control of the GCES, persuading him to act as if it was his own idea so that no one would know that Min Donner or Warden Dios had anything to do with it.

As Min is about to leave, she and Sixten are attacked by a kaze that Min recognizes in time to prevent the kaze's surgically implanted explosives from killing them. Despite being injured, Min then leaves so that no one knows she was there.

The Kaze causes the GCES to announce a state of emergency, suspending GCES meetings until further notice. Warden Dios declares a similar lockdown at UMCPHQ, suspecting that Frik or Fasner might be behind the kaze to keep Sixten from proposing the bill of severance that Dios hoped only he, Min and Sixten knew about.

Fasner attempts to summon Frik to his private orbiting station, but Frik refuses, citing Dios' orders as explanation, but in actuality he would rather not confront his boss and mentor. Another kaze kills Frik.

Dios is summoned to Fasner's home instead and is asked to explain why he disclosed so much information as to horrify the GCES, and why he restricted Frik's movements, resulting in his death. Dios manages to answer, but does not completely satisfy Fasner. Fasner mentions that he is aware that Dios sent Min Donner to the borders of forbidden space to await the return of Angus and Milos. He instructs Dios to tell Donner to kill Angus and Milos should anything go wrong.

Notes

1993 American novels
1993 science fiction novels
Novels by Stephen R. Donaldson
The Gap Cycle